McCrae is a suburb on the Mornington Peninsula in Melbourne, Victoria, Australia,  south of Melbourne's Central Business District, located within the Shire of Mornington Peninsula local government area. McCrae recorded a population of 3,311 at the 2021 census.

McCrae is known for the McCrae Lighthouse. No longer an operating lighthouse, it marked the turning point for shipping in the main navigational channels between Port Phillip Heads and Melbourne.

Between 1861 and 1934 McCrae was originally known as Dromana West, and in 1934, following a century of the McCrae family residing at what was then known as 'Arthurs Seat Homestead' (now 'McCrae Homestead'), the locals petitioned to have the township renamed McCrae.

Recently a new shopping center called McCrae Plaza opened and it included a Bilo Supermarket, which later became a Coles Supermarket.

The area was named after the McCrae family who were the first Europeans to settle the area. The homestead that they built, McCrae Homestead, is a National Trust property that is open to the public.

In March 2011, McCrae Yacht Club hosted the Victorian Championship regattas for the A-Class Catamarans. They sailed seven races from 12 to 14 March.

Notable people

 Nikki Osborne
 Chris Mew

See also
 Shire of Flinders – McCrae was previously within this former local government area.

References

Suburbs of Melbourne
Suburbs of the Shire of Mornington Peninsula